Ryszard Jerzy Galla (born 22 July 1956 in Wrocław) is a Polish politician of German heritage. Originally a member of the Opole Regional Assembly and briefly the Marshal of Opole Voivodeship in 2002, Galla was elected to the Sejm during the 2005 parliamentary election, getting 9072 votes in the 21st Opole district, and as of 2015, is the only Sejm member from the German Minority political party.

Electoral history

See also
List of Sejm members (2005–2007)

References

External links
Ryszard Galla - parliamentary page - includes declarations of interest, voting record, and transcripts of speeches.

1956 births
Living people
Polish people of German descent
Commanders Crosses of the Order of Merit of the Federal Republic of Germany
Members of the Polish Sejm 2005–2007
Members of the Polish Sejm 2007–2011
Members of the Polish Sejm 2011–2015
Members of the Polish Sejm 2015–2019
Members of the Polish Sejm 2019–2023
Politicians from Wrocław
Voivodeship marshals of Poland
Opole Voivodeship